Jeremy Robert Edward Campbell-Lamerton (born 21 February 1957 in Gibraltar) is a former Scottish national team international rugby union player.

Army career
Campbell-Lamerton served as an officer with the Scots Guards in Germany, in Northern Ireland and through the Falklands war, reaching the rank of Captain before he left the British Army in 1983.

Rugby Union career

Amateur career

After leaving Downside School Campbell-Lamerton matriculated at Durham University in 1975, where he read for a General Arts degree and competed for the university rugby team. He was 6 ft 5 and a half inches and 17.5 stone and played at lock.

He went on to play for London Scottish.

Provincial career

He played for the Anglo-Scots District in the Scottish Inter-District Championship. He captained the side in 1986-87 season.

International career

He won 2 caps for Scotland 'B' in the period 1985-86.

He won 3 caps playing for the Scottish national team in the 1986–7 season.

He made his international debut for Scotland on 18 January 1986 at Murrayfield against France.

He was selected for the Scotland squad for the 1987 Rugby World Cup. He played two matches in the tournament, the last against Romania on 2 June 1987 in Dunedin.

Family
He is the son of Mike Campbell-Lamerton, the noted rugby player. He has one son and three daughters (one of whom, Olivia, played tennis for Great Britain).

See also
 Rugby union in Gibraltar

References

Sources
 Bath, Richard (ed.) The Complete Book of Rugby (Seven Oaks Ltd, 1997 )
 Massie, Allan A Portrait of Scottish Rugby (Polygon, Edinburgh)

External links 
 

1959 births
Living people
Scottish rugby union players
Scotland international rugby union players
Combined Services rugby union players
Army rugby union players
Gibraltarians
Gibraltarian rugby union players
Alumni of Hatfield College, Durham
Durham University RFC players
People educated at Downside School
Scots Guards officers
British Army personnel of the Falklands War
London Scottish F.C. players
Scottish Exiles (rugby union) players
Scotland 'B' international rugby union players
Rugby union locks